Central Christian College of the Bible is a private Christian college in Moberly, Missouri.  Founded in 1957, it is accredited by the Association for Biblical Higher Education and focuses on biblical instruction and practical training for its students. It offers Bachelor of Arts and Bachelor of Science degrees and certificates in ministry-related programs. In 2020, Central began offering a graduate program for a Master of Arts in Ministry Leadership degree.

Campus
Moberly High School and Zion Lutheran Church are adjacent to the campus. Timber Lake Christian Church and the YMCA are within walking distance.

Central's campus features seven buildings and two outdoor athletic fields. Pelfrey Hall contains the cafeteria, gymnasium, offices, classrooms and conference room. Reese Resource Center, completed in 2001, contains the library and bookstore. Lang Hall is the men's dormitory and Spurling Hall is the women's dormitory. North of Pelfrey Hall is the maintenance facility. Foundation Hall, which opened for residents for the Fall 2004 semester, houses men and women on separate floors. The newest facility, the Walton Student Center, contains The Harvest House (a coffee house), a computer hub, lounging areas around TVs, a workout room, a prayer room, and a collaboratory room.

Athletics
The CCCB Saints hold dual affiliation with both the Association of Christian College Athletics (ACCA) and the National Christian College Athletic Association (NCCAA). The men's soccer team was placed second in the 2007 ACCA National Tournament, and won the 2008 ACCA National Tournament. The team was placed 8th in the NCCAA Division II National Championships. Central also offers women's volleyball and both men's and women's basketball. The women's basketball program placed third in the Midwest Christian College Conference in 2006.

In the 2008–2009 season, the Central Christian College Saints men's basketball team set a school record for most wins in a season with 20 wins. It was placed second in the 2009 ACCA national tournament, while finishing the season with a 20–14 record.

In the 2014–2015 season, the Central Christian College Saints women's basketball team took second at nationals.

CCCB offers men's and women's basketball.

Accreditation
The school does not have regional accreditation. The school pursued regional accreditation with the HLC from 2013 to 2017. On July 31, 2017, the "Central’s executive leadership team and the Board of Directors agreed to withdraw voluntarily from the process" of regional accreditation with the HLC after conversations with the HLC.

The school does have national accreditation via the Association for Biblical Higher Education and is recognized as an approved institution by the USDE and MDHE, which allows students at the school to receive veterans’ benefits and federal financial aid.

References

External links
Official website
Official athletics website

Association for Biblical Higher Education
Seminaries and theological colleges in Missouri
Universities and colleges affiliated with the Christian churches and churches of Christ
Bible colleges
Educational institutions established in 1957
Buildings and structures in Randolph County, Missouri
Education in Randolph County, Missouri
1957 establishments in Missouri